John Renton Wightman (2 November 1912 – 20 April 1964) was a Scottish footballer who played for Scarborough, York City, Bradford Park Avenue, Huddersfield Town, Blackburn Rovers and Carlisle United. He was born in Duns. He died on 20 April 1964 in Blackburn, Lancashire.

References
General

Specific

1912 births
1964 deaths
People from Duns, Scottish Borders
Scottish footballers
Association football wing halves
Scarborough F.C. players
York City F.C. players
Bradford (Park Avenue) A.F.C. players
Huddersfield Town A.F.C. players
Blackburn Rovers F.C. players
Carlisle United F.C. players
English Football League players
Sportspeople from the Scottish Borders